was a Japanese the Liberal Democratic Party (LDP) politician who briefly served as finance minister from 27 January to 30 July 1998.

Early life and education
Matsunaga was born on 23 November 1928. He is a graduate of Waseda University's law school.

Career
Matsunaga was an attorney and prosecutor. He began his career as a public prosecutor in southern regions of Japan in the 1950s. Later he became a member of the LDP, being a member of the Seirankai. Matsunaga was education minister in the mid-1980s. He served as minister of international trade and industry. He was appointed by Prime Minister Toshiki Kaifu to this post on 9 August 1989.

Then he was appointed by Prime Minister Ryutaro Hashimoto as the minister of finance on 27 January 1998. Matsunaga replaced Hiroshi Mitsuzuka as finance minister. Mitsuzuka was forced to resign due to corrupt behaviour of the officials at the ministry. In April 1998, Matsunaga reported that 112 ministry officials would be punished due to their excessive entertainment from banks, brokerage firms and insurers under their supervision. Matsunaga's term as finance minister was short lived, and he resigned on 30 July 1998, replaced by Kiichi Miyazawa, another veteran LDP politician.

In addition to these cabinet roles, Matsunaga held the following positions in the Diet: Chairman of the lower house budget committee until 1998, director of the Diet education committee and vice-chairman of the PARC education division. He lost his seat in the lower house election on 25 June 2000.

Death
Matsunaga died on 11 October 2022, at the age of 93.

References

External links

1928 births
2022 deaths
20th-century Japanese politicians
Government ministers of Japan
Liberal Democratic Party (Japan) politicians
Matsunaga clan
Members of the House of Representatives (Japan)
Members of the House of Representatives from Saitama Prefecture
Ministers of Finance of Japan
Waseda University alumni
Politicians from Nagasaki Prefecture
Grand Cordons of the Order of the Rising Sun